Mount Meru (Sanskrit/Pali: मेरु), also known as Sumeru, Sineru or Mahāmeru, is the sacred five-peaked mountain of  Hindu, Jain, and Buddhist cosmology and is considered to be the centre of all the physical, metaphysical and spiritual universes. The mountain is also mentioned in some scriptures of non-Indian based religions such as Taoism which was influenced by the arrival of Buddhism in China. There is no clear identification of Mount Meru with a particular geophysical location. 

Many famous Buddhist, Jain, and Hindu temples have been built as symbolic representations of this mountain. The "Sumeru Throne" 須彌座 xūmízuò style base is a common feature of Chinese pagodas. The highest point (the finial bud) on the pyatthat, a Burmese-style multi-tiered roof, represents Mount Meru.

Etymology 
Etymologically, the proper name of the mountain is Meru (Sanskrit: Meru), to which is added the approbatory prefix su-, resulting in the meaning "excellent Meru" or "wonderful Meru". Meru is also the name of the central bead in a mālā.

In other languages 
In other languages, Mount Meru is pronounced:
 Assamese:  (Meru Pôrbôt)
 Bengali:  (Meru Porbot)
 Burmese: 
 Cebuano: 
 Chinese:  (Xūmíshān)
 Gujarati:  (Meru Parvat)
 Sanskrit,  Marathi, Hindi:  (Meru Parvat)
 Ilocano: 
 Japanese:  (Shumisen)
 Javanese:  (Semeru)
 Kannada:  (Meru Parvata)
 Khmer:  (Phnom Preah Someru) or (Phnom Preah Somae)
 Korean:  (Sumisan)
 Malayalam:  (Mahameru Parvatham)
 Mongolian:  (Sümber Uul)
 Odia:  (“Meru Pôrbôtô”)
 Pāli: 
 Tagalog: 
 Tamil:  (Maha Meru Malai)
 Telugu:  (Meru Parvatam)
 Sinhala:  (Maha Meru Parvathaya)
 Tibetan: 
 Thai:  (Khao phra sumen)
 Vietnamese:

Geography
The dimensions attributed to Mount Meru — which all refer to it as a part of the Cosmic Ocean, along with several other statements that describe it in geographically vague terms (e.g., "the Sun along with all the planets circle the mountain") — make the determination of its location most difficult, according to most scholars.

Several researchers identify Mount Meru or Sumeru with the Pamirs, northwest of Kashmir.

The Suryasiddhanta mentions that Mt. Meru lies at the centre the Earth ("bhuva-madhya") in the land of the Jambunad (Jambudvīpa). Narapatijayacharyasvarodaya, a ninth-century text, based on mostly unpublished texts of Yāmal Tantr, mentions:
 " Prithvī-madhye shrūyate drishyate na tu"
 (Sumeru is heard to be at the centre of the Earth, but is not seen there).
Several versions of cosmology can be found in existing Hindu texts. In one of them, cosmologically, the Meru mountain was also described as being surrounded by Mandrachala Mountain to the east, Suparshva Mountain to the west, Kumuda Mountain to the north and Kailasa to the south.

In Buddhism 

According to Buddhist cosmology, Mount Meru (or Sumeru) is at the centre of the world, and Jambūdvīpa is south of it. It is 80,000 yojanas wide and 80,000 yojanas high according to the Abhidharmakośabhāṣyam and 84,000 yojanas high according to the Long Āgama Sutra. Trāyastriṃśa is on its peak, where Śakra resides. The Sun and the Moon revolve around Mount Meru, and as the Sun passes behind it, it becomes nighttime. The mountain has four faces — each one made of a different material; the northern face is made of gold, the eastern one is made of crystal, the southern one is made of lapis lazuli, and the western one is made of ruby.

In Vajrayāna, maṇḍala offerings often include Mount Meru, as they in part represent the entire universe. It is also believed that Mount Meru is the home of the buddha Cakrasaṃvara.

In Hinduism 

The Sun, along with all the planets in the Solar System, revolve around Mt. Meru as one unit.

One yojana can be taken to mean about 11.5 km (9 miles), though its magnitude seems to differ over time periods — e.g., the Earth's circumference is 3,200 yojanas according to Varahamihira and slightly less so in the Aryabhatiya, but is said to be 5,026.5 yojanas in the Suryasiddhānta. The Matsya Purana and the Bhagvata Purana, along with some other Hindu texts, consistently give the height of 84,000 yojanas to Mount Meru, which translates into 672,000 miles or 1,082,000 kilometers.

Mount Meru was said to be the residence of King Padamja Brahma in antiquity.

According to Charles Allen, Mount Kailash is identified with Mount Meru. One description in the Vishnu Purana of the mountain states that its four faces are made of crystal, ruby, gold, and lapis lazuli. It is a pillar of the world and is located at the heart of six mountain ranges symbolizing a lotus.

In Jainism 

According to Jain cosmology, Mount Meru (or Sumeru) is at the centre of the world surrounded by Jambūdvīpa, in form of a circle forming a diameter of 100,000 yojanas. There are two sets of sun, moon and stars revolving around Mount Meru; while one set works, the other set rests behind Mount Meru.

Every Tirthankara is taken to the summit of Meru by Indra shortly after his birth, after putting the Tirthankara child's mother  into deep slumber. There, he is bathed and anointed with precious unctions. Indra and other Devas celebrate his birth.

Javanese legends
This mythical mountain of gods was mentioned in the Tantu Pagelaran, an Old Javanese manuscript written in the 15th-century Majapahit period. The manuscript describes the mythical origin of the island of Java, as well as the legendary movement of portions of Mount Meru to Java. The manuscript explains that Batara Guru (Shiva) ordered the gods Brahma and Vishnu to fill Java with human beings. However, at that time, Java island was floating freely on the ocean, always tumbling and shaking. To stop the island's movement, the gods decided to nail it to the Earth by moving the part of Mahameru in Jambudvipa (India) and attaching it to Java. The resulting mountain is Mount Semeru, the tallest mountain on Java.

Architecture 

The concept of a holy mountain surrounded by various circles was incorporated into ancient Hindu temple architecture with a Shikhara (Śikhara) — a Sanskrit word translating literally to "mountain peak." Early examples of this style can be found at the Harshat Mata Temple and Harshnath Temple from the 8th century CE in Rajasthan, Western India. This concept also continued outside India, such as in Bali, where temples feature Meru towers.

In Buddhist temples, the Mahabodhi Temple in Bodh Gaya is the earliest example of the 5th- to 6th-century depiction. Many other Buddhist temples took on this form, such as the Wat Arun in Thailand and the Hsinbyume Pagoda in Myanmar.

See also
Hara Berezaiti
Himavanta
Yggdrasil

Notes

Sources

 .
Narpatijayacharyā, commentary by Ganeshdatta Pathak, Published by Chowkhambha Sanskrit Sansthana, Varanasi, India, PIN-221001.

External links

 Description of Mount Meru in the Devi-bhagavata-purana 12
 Painting of Mount Meru found in Buddhist cave sanctuary in Xinjiang, China
 Mount Meru in Encyclopedia of Buddhist Iconography 12
 Sumeru in Encyclopedia of Buddhist Iconography 12
 Ngari
 Tibetan Cosmological Models
 What is Mount Meru?

 
Locations in Hindu mythology
Hindu cosmology
Meru
Meru
Ancient Indian mountains
Buddhist cosmology
Buddhist mythology
Mountains in Buddhism